The Catholic Church operates numerous charitable organizations.

Catholic spiritual teaching includes spreading the Gospel, while Catholic social teaching emphasises support for the sick, the poor and the afflicted through the corporal and spiritual works of mercy. The Catholic Church is the largest non-governmental provider of education and medical services in the world.

History
The Catholic Church has had a long tradition of coordinating charity to the poor, something that was closely linked to the early Christian Eucharist, with the office of deacon being started for this purpose.

Over time this became a part of the bishop's responsibilities and then from the fourth century onwards was decentralised to parishes and monastic orders.  After the Reformation, the Church lost a large amount of property in both Catholic and Protestant countries, and after a period of sharply increased poverty, poor relief had to become more tax based.

Within the United States, each diocese typically has a Catholic Charities organization that is run as a diocesan corporation, i.e., a civil corporation owned by the diocese or archdiocese.

List of major Catholic charities (non-exhaustive)

 Aid to the Church in Need
 Ascension
 CAFOD
 Catholic Charities USA
 Catholic Home Missions
 Catholic Near East Welfare Association
 Catholic Relief Services
 Caritas Internationalis
 CIDSE
 Community of Sant'Egidio
 Cordaid
 Fidesco International
 Jesuit Refugee Service
 Malteser International
 Maryknoll
 Missionaries of the Poor
 Pontifical Mission Societies
 Renovabis
 Society of St Vincent de Paul
 Talitha Kum
Trócaire

See also
 Christian humanitarian aid
 Catholic Church and health care
 Catholic school
 Catholic higher education
 Ad gentes
 Catholic lay organisations

References

 
Charity